An Air Defense Direction Center (ADDC) was a type of United States command post for assessing Cold War radar tracks, assigning height requests to available height-finder radars, and for "Weapons Direction": coordinating command guidance of aircraft from more than 1 site for ground-controlled interception ("weapons assignment"). As with the World War II Aircraft Warning Service CONUS defense network, a "manual air defense system" was used through the 1950s (e.g., NORAD/ADC used a " plotting board" at the Ent command center.)  Along with 182 radar stations at "the end of 1957, ADC operated … 17 control centers", and the Ground Observation Corps was TBD on TBD.	  With the formation of NORAD, several types of ADDCs were planned by Air Defense Command:

Joint Direction Center, a USAF ADDC collocated with an Army Air Defense Command Post, AADCP (together designated a "NORAD Control Center").  
Alaskan Joint Direction Center, at 2 sites: Fire Island and Murphy Dome Air Force Station for the Alaskan Air Command Semi-Automatic Defense System (ALSADS)
Semi-Automatic Direction Center (SAGE Direction Center), an ADCC (e.g., the "Duluth Sector Direction Center") with a command, control, and coordination system that provided the Semi-Automatic Ground Environment (SAGE), e.g., AN/FSQ-7 or AN/GSA-51 (in 1958, NORAD "forecast full SAGE direction center capability" by January 1963.)
Combined Direction-Combat Center, a USAF ADDC collocated with a SAGE Combat Center (e.g., DC-03 & CC-01 at Hancock Field for the Syracuse Air Defense Sector)
SCC Direction Center (SCC/DC), a USAF ADDC to be collocated with a planned Super Combat Center in a nuclear bunker (no SCCs, SCC/DCs, or above-ground DCs with AN/FSQ-32 were ever completed)
Manual Direction Center, an ADCC without a SAGE CCCS, successors to the Manual Air Defense Control Centers of the Permanent System (cf. ADCCs with a "pre-SAGE semiautomatic intercept system")
NIKE direction center, Army Project Nike AADCPs for coordinating surface-to-air missile fire from multiple batteries, e.g., W-13DC (at the Fort Meade radar station) through LA-45DC (Fort MacArthur Direction Center), 9 of which were within Missile Master nuclear bunkers.

Most ADDCs were replaced by Regional Operations Control Centers of the Joint Surveillance System (FOC on December 23, 1980).

References

North American Aerospace Defense Command
Military command and control installations
Air defense